PIRIX Internet Exchange is Internet Exchange Point situated in Saint-Petersburg (Russia).

PIRIX is a center for broadband connectivity and Internet services in Saint-Petersburg. It offers peering, switching and housing facilities to Internet Access and Service Providers. PIRIX started in 2009 and is a fast-growing, neutral and independent peering point.

Customers
More than 40 different carriers and ISPs now participate in PIRIX data-points, including:
Google
Yandex
Interzet
ER-Telecom

See also 
 List of Internet exchange points

External links
 PIRIX Internet Exchange (official website)

Internet exchange points in Russia
Internet in Russia